Metopism is the condition of having a persistent metopic suture, or persistence of the frontal metopic suture in the adult human skull. Metopism  is the opposite of craniosynostosis. The main  factor of the metopic suture is to increase the volume of the anterior cranial fossa. The frontal bone includes the forehead, and the  roofs of the orbits (bony sockets) of the eyes.
The frontal bone has vertical portion (squama) and horizontal portion (orbital part). Some adults have a metopic or frontal suture in the vertical portion. In uterine period in right and left half of frontal region of the fetus there is a membrane tissue. On each half a primary ossification center appears about the end of the second month of the fetus. Primary ossification center extends  to form the corresponding half of the vertical part (squama) and horizontal part (orbital part) of the frontal bone.

At birth the frontal bone contains two portions, separated by the metopic (frontal) suture. Metopism is the condition of having a persistent metopic suture. Metopic suture is regularly obliterated, except at its lower part, by the eighth year, but infrequently persists throughout life. There is no single proven cause of metopism. The occurrence  is from mild to serious situations. Visional,  learning, and behavioral problems may happen in serious metopism. Some don't need any medical treatment. Surgery is a successful approach for those who  need it. Treatment teams include:  neurosurgeons, plastic surgeons, neurologists, oral and  maxillofacial surgeons, audiologists, neuroscience nursing professionals, speech therapists, physical therapists, dentist, otolaryngologists, ophthalmologists, psychiatrists, psychologists and social workers.

Additional image

References

Sources
 Online version of Gray's Anatomy — The complete 20th U.S. edition of Gray's Anatomy of the Human Body, published in 1918. NB: This is the most recent American version that is in the public domain.
 First edition of Gray's Anatomy, 1858 (direct PDF link)

 

Congenital disorders of musculoskeletal system